Please add the names of notable painters with a Wikipedia page, in precise English alphabetical order, using U.S. spelling conventions. Country and regional names refer to where painters worked for long periods, not to personal allegiances.

Nadim Karam (born 1957), Lebanese artist
Isabel Naftel (1832–1912), English artist
Maud Naftel (1856–1890), English painter
Paul Jacob Naftel (1817–1891), Guernsey/English painter and teacher
Urakusai Nagahide (有楽斎長秀, fl. 1804 – c. 1848), Japanese ukiyo-e woodblock printer
Nagasawa Rosetsu (長沢芦雪, 1754–1799), Japanese painter
Aaron Nagel, (born 1980), American artist
Patrick Nagel, (1945–1984), American artist and illustrator
István Nagy (1873–1937), Hungarian painter 
Matthijs Naiveu, (1647–1721), Dutch painter
Naka Bokunen (名嘉睦稔, born 1953), Japanese (Okinawa) print-maker
Nakahara Nantenbō (中原南天棒, 1839–1925), artist and Zen master
Naondo Nakamura (中村 直人, 1905–1981), Japanese painter and sculptor
Tadashi Nakayama (born 1927), Japanese woodblock printer
Nam Gye-u (남계우, 1811–1888), Korean painter and official
Carlos Trillo Name (born 1941) Cuban painter
Naza (born 1955), Brazilian/American painter 
Albert Namatjira (1902–1959), Australian aboriginal painter
Lisa Nankivil (born 1958), American painter and print-maker
Nara Yoshitomo (奈良美智, born 1959), Japanese artist
Oscar Rodríguez Naranjo (1907–2006), Colombian painter and sculptor
Jørgen Nash (1920–2004), Danish artist and writer
Paul Nash (1889–1946), English painter and war artist
Alexander Nasmyth (1758–1840), Scottish painter
Anne Nasmyth (1798–1874), Scottish/English painter and teacher
Barbara Nasmyth (1790–1870), Scottish/English painter and educator
Charlotte Nasmyth (1804–1884), Scottish/English painter
Jane Nasmyth (1788–1867), Scottish painter
Patrick Nasmyth (1787–1831), Scottish painter
Jean-Marc Nattier (1685–1766), French painter
Bruce Nauman (born 1941), American artist
Josef Navrátil (1798–1865), Austro-Hungarian (Bohemian) mural and fresco painter
Naza (born 1955), Brazilian/America] painter
Radi Nedelchev (born 1938), Bulgarian artist especially of landscapes, village life, and festivals
Alice Neel (1900–1984), American painter
Aert van der Neer (1603–1677), Dutch painter
Eglon van der Neer (1633–1703), Dutch painter
Almada Negreiros (1893–1970), Portuguese painter, poet and writer
LeRoy Neiman (1927–2012), American painter
Kristin Nelson (1945–2018), American painter, actor and author
Albert Nemethy (1920–1998), Hungarian-American painter
Odd Nerdrum (born 1944), Norwegian figurative painter.
Ismael Nery (1900–1934), Brazilian painter, poet and architect
Ugo Nespolo (born 1941), Italian artist
Mikhail Nesterov (1862–1942), Russian artist
Caspar Netscher (1639–1684), Dutch painter
Louise Nevelson (1900–1988), American artist
NEVERCREW (born 1980 and 1979), Swiss duo of urban artists
Jessie Newbery (1864–1948), Scottish artist and embroiderer
Barnett Newman (1905–1970), American artist
Roy Newell (1914–2006), American painter
Ni Duan (倪端, 1436–1505), Chinese imperial painter
Ni Tian (倪田, 1855–1919), Chinese painter
Ni Yuanlu (倪元璐, 1593–1644) Chinese calligrapher, painter and official
Ni Zan (倪瓚, 1301–1374), Chinese painter
Ben Nicholson (1894–1982), English abstract painter
William Nicholson (1872–1949), English painter
John Nicolson (1891–1951), Scottish/English painter, etcher and illustrator
Nicomachus of Thebes (4th century BCE), Ancient Greek painter
Caro Niederer (born 1963), Swiss artist
Ejnar Nielsen (1872–1956), Danish painter and illustrator
Jan Nieuwenhuys (1922–1986), Dutch painter
Nína Tryggvadóttir (1913–1968), Icelandic artist
Nishida Shun'ei (西田俊英, born 1953), Japanese painter and art professor
Nishikawa Sukenobu (西川祐信, 1671–1750), Japanese print-maker
Margaret Graeme Niven (1906–1997), English painter 
Nōami (能阿弥, 1397–1471), Japanese artist and connoisseur
James Campbell Noble (1845–1913), Scottish painter
Robert Noble (1857–1917), Scottish artist
Isamu Noguchi (野口勇, 1904–1988), American artist and landscape architect
Gavin Nolan (born 1977), Welsh/English painter
Sidney Nolan (1917–1992), Australia painter and print-maker
Kenneth Noland (1924–2010), American painter
Emil Nolde (1867–1956), German painter and print-maker
Reinier Nooms (1623–1667), Dutch painter and etcher
Jean-Pierre Norblin de La Gourdaine (1745–1830), French/Polish painter, draftsman and engraver
Max Magnus Norman (born 1973), Swedish artist, painter and sculptor
Raymond Normand (1919–2000), French painter
Vladimir Novak (born 1947), Czechoslovak/Czech painter, graphic artist and illustrator
Guity Novin (born 1944), Iranian/Canadian painter
Zbigniew Nowosadzki (born 1957), Polish painter
Zoltán Nuridsány (1925–1974), Hungarian painter of Armenian origin
Arvid Nyholm (1866–1927), Swedish/American painter

References
References can be found under each entry.

N